Nagel is a municipality in the district of Wunsiedel in Bavaria in Germany.

References 

Wunsiedel (district)